Mya Lay Sein (born 1954) is a Burmese physiologist, former badminton player and Deputy Minister for Health and Sports for Myanmar from 2018 to 2021.

Career 
Mya has always been very active in sports, culminating in 15 years of international representation in badminton for Myanmar team. She was a silver medallist in the 1979 WBF World Championships with partner Wai Nyunt in mixed doubles category. At the same time she has also studied at Yangon Institute of Medicine 1 and graduated in 1982.

She received the certificate of the Postgraduate Training Sports Medicine from the Singapore Sports Council, the degrees of MSpMed (Master of Sports Medicine) and  PhD (Sports Medicine & Shoulder) from  the University of New South Wales, Australia. She served as the vice president of Myanmar Badminton Federation. On 2 July 2018, the president Win Myint appointed her as the deputy minister for Ministry of Health and Sports.

Achievements

World Championships 
Mixed doubles

Southeast Asian Games 
Women's doubles

References

Living people
Burmese politicians
Burmese female badminton players
Burmese physiologists
1954 births